Burd Patterson House is a historic home located at Pottsville, Schuylkill County, Pennsylvania.  It was built about 1830, and is a -story, brick mansion in the Federal style. A rear addition was built about 1835, connecting the main house to a formerly separate summer kitchen.  The main house measures 27 feet by 40 feet.  It features a Queen Anne style porch added before 1900.

It was added to the National Register of Historic Places in 1995.

References

Houses on the National Register of Historic Places in Pennsylvania
Federal architecture in Pennsylvania
Houses completed in 1835
Houses in Schuylkill County, Pennsylvania
National Register of Historic Places in Schuylkill County, Pennsylvania